The Hull-Hawkins House (also known as the Hawkins House) is a historic house near Live Oak, Florida. It is located at 10 miles south of Live Oak on Former State Road 49. The actual location is closer to McAlpin. On May 7, 1973, it was added to the U.S. National Register of Historic Places.

References

 Suwannee County listings at National Register of Historic Places
 Suwannee County listings at Florida's Office of Cultural and Historical Programs

Houses on the National Register of Historic Places in Florida
Houses in Suwannee County, Florida
National Register of Historic Places in Suwannee County, Florida